The Czech Republic women's national rugby union team played their first international in 2004.

History
Czechia climbed to their highest ranking of 31st from 44th after defeating Belgium 29–21 in 2022.

Results summary

(Full internationals only)

See also
 Rugby union in the Czech Republic

References

External links
 Česká Rugbyová Unie - Official Site 

Rugby union in the Czech Republic
European national women's rugby union teams
Women's national rugby union teams
Women|Rugby union